Pieta Brown (born 1973) is a critically acclaimed American artist, musician, producer, multi-instrumentalist, and singer-songwriter who has released eight albums and five EPs. She has performed with artists such as Mark Knopfler, John Prine, Amos Lee, Justin Vernon and Calexico. Although she's considered a folk/indie singer-songwriter, Brown also names country blues and jazz as strong influences on her musical style.

Early life
Brown was born in Iowa City, Iowa, United States. Her early "bohemian" upbringing was in rural Iowa in a house with no running water, heat, or indoor bathroom. There, Brown was exposed to traditional and rural folk music through her father, singer-songwriter Greg Brown. Brown's parents separated when she was very young and at age 8 she moved to Birmingham, Alabama with her single working mother. Pieta spent her childhood living in 17 different residences between Iowa and Alabama with a short time in St. Paul, Minnesota. While living with her mother in Alabama, Brown began writing poetry and composing instrumental songs on piano.

Career
Pieta released her self-titled debut record in 2002, co-produced with Grammy Award-winning producer Bo Ramsey, which NPR Music heralded as "a ghostly collection of largely melancholy songs rooted in the blues." Her 2005 follow-up In The Cool was named one of the year's best by Amazon Music who called it "calming, hypnotic, and seductive." Her next album, Remember The Sun, was released in 2007 and was cited as one of the year's best by The Wall Street Journal. In 2009, Brown released an EP called Shimmer, which was produced by Don Was after hearing her on his car radio in a live solo performance.

In 2010, Brown signed with Red House Records and released One and All. She joined Mark Knopfler’s North American tour later that year, had a string of performance dates with John Prine, participated in a full orchestral show with Brandi Carlile, and embarked on her own performance tour in Australia. It was followed by the 2011 release of Mercury which held the #1 position on the American Folk Radio Chart for 5 months, was included in iTunes''' Great Americana Albums of 2011, and landed at #26 in American Songwriter's Top 50 Albums of 2011. All Music Guide called it "terrific," while Exclaim! named it "not just a beautiful album, but an essential one."

Brown released her sixth studio album Paradise Outlaw in 2014. It was heralded by many as her most critically successful album to date, including praises from NPR's Weekend Edition, Bust Magazine, Folk Alley, and American Songwriter among others. It was recorded and mixed by renowned engineer BJ Burton at April Base Studio and features guests Amos Lee, Mark Knopfler, and studio owner Justin Vernon of Bon Iver. Vernon would later cite this as his "favorite album recorded at April Base."

In 2017, Pieta struck out on her own for her first independent self-release Postcards. True to its name, the album explores the role of distance and isolation through collaboration as Brown enlisted special guest artists for each track through the mail. She described the process as “musical postcards,” consisting of her original stripped-down, acoustic shells of the song that each artist would then add their parts to and mail back. The list of collaborators included Mark Knopfler, Calexico, Mason Jennings, Mike Lewis, David Lindley, and Carrie Rodriguez among many others. The unique nature of Postcards won over critics, including Billboard, Chicago Tribune, Guitar World, and American Songwriter who stated, “Brown sounds committed and melancholy throughout, a natural extension of the solitary circumstances that created this moving, emotional music.”

Pieta’s latest full-length album Freeway was released on September 20, 2019 through Ani DiFranco’s Righteous Babe Records. It was co-produced with S. Carey of Bon Iver and recorded at Justin Vernon’s April Base Studios. In addition to Carey, who also plays on the album, it features bassist Mike Lewis (Bon Iver, Andrew Bird) and guitarist Jeremy Ylvisaker (Andrew Bird, Alpha Consumer). Freeway was recorded mostly live over the course of just three days with Carey, Lewis, and Ylvisaker hearing the songs for the first time on the spot in the studio while recording. Of the experimental process, Pieta said “it allowed them to rely on their gut instincts and to react to the tunes (and each other) in real time.” Freeway was met with widespread critical acclaim from NPR Music, Stereogum, Paste, Billboard, Flood Magazine, and American Songwriter among many others. Don Was also participated by writing the liner notes for the album.

In 2020, Pieta released the collaborative EP/digital triptych We Are Not Machines via the artist collective label 37d03d. The 3-track release centers around the single “We Are Not Machines” which features Ani DiFranco and S. Carey. It was originally recorded in November 2019 at Justin Vernon and Aaron Dessner’s annual HIVER Festival in Eaux Claires, WI. The other two tracks on the EP expand on the single’s original theme, featuring contributions from William Brittelle, Holland Andrews, Jenn Wasner, The Metropolis Ensemble, knotahaiku, Limit Infrared, and Grammy-nominated visual artist Eric Timothy Carlson.

Throughout her career to date, Brown has toured and shared stages with Mark Knopfler, John Prine, Brandi Carlile, JJ Cale, Emmylou Harris, Richard Thompson, Ani DiFranco, Calexico, Neko Case, Mason Jennings, Shawn Mullins, Carrie Rodriguez, Howe Gelb and Jim Lauderdale among many others. She has performed at festivals around the world, including Bonnaroo, Mountain Jam, Edmonton Folk Music Festival, Celtic Connections, and more. Pieta has also co-written songs with Amos Lee, Iris Dement, Calexico, Lucie Thorne, Bo Ramsey, and Bertrand Belin among others.

 Film career 
In 2017, Pieta relocated to Europe for the better part of a year to star in the leading role of the feminist/indie Swiss foreign film (in French) Autour de Luisa ("Around Luisa"). Brown also co-wrote several original songs that were featured in the film with French pop singer-songwriter Bertrand Belin, who also appeared in the film. This debut led to an invitation to appear in the underground experimental zombie short film The Bride, directed by Vincent Parronaud featuring the music of Thomas De Pourquery and Supersonic.

Discography
Studio albums
 2002: Pieta Brown (Trailer Records)
 2005: In the Cool (Valley Entertainment)
 2007: Remember the Sun (One Little Independent)
 2010: One and All (Red House)
 2011: Mercury (Red House)
 2014: Paradise Outlaw (Red House)
 2017: Postcards (Lustre)
 2019: Freeway (Righteous Babe)

Singles and EPs
 2003: I Never Told You (T Records)
 2007: "This Land Is Your Land" featuring Calexico
 2008: Flight Time (T Records)
 2009: Shimmer (Red House)
 2015: Drifters (Lustre)
 2020: We Are Not Machines (37d03d)

Compilations and Contributions
 2002: Going Driftless: An Artist's Tribute to Greg Brown (Red House Records) - "Ella Mae"
 2006: A Case For Case: A Tribute to the Songs of Peter Case (Hungry For Music) – "Spell of Wheels"
 2007: Just One More: A Tribute To Larry Brown (Bloodshot) – "Another Place in Time"
 2008: Before The Goldrush: A Project to Benefit Teach For America - "Birds"
 2010: Think Out Loud - "King Of My Heart"
 2011: A Nod to Bob 2 (Red House) – "Dirt Road Blues"
 2013: Fall to Rise (Little Secret Records) – "Love Over Gold (with Lucie Thorne)"

Guest Artist
 2004: Greg Brown – Honey in the Lion's Head (Trailer)
 2006: Bo Ramsey – Stranger Blues - co-producer
 2008: Bo Ramsey – Fragile (Continental Song City) - co-producer
 2008: Calexico – Carried to Dust (Quarterstick)
 2008: The Wood Brothers – Loaded (Blue Note)
 2009: Chad Elliot – Redemption Man 2011: Amos Lee – Mission Bell (Blue Note)
 2012: Greg Brown – Hymns For What Is Left 2012: Calexico – Algiers (Anti-)
 2013: Mason Jennings – Always Been 2015: Calexico – Edge of the Sun (Quarterstick)
 2015: Iris DeMent – The Trackless Woods (Flariella)
 2015: Lucie Thorne – Everything Sings Tonight 2016: The Pines – Above The Prairie (Red House)
 2018: Jeffrey Foucalt – Blood Brothers''

References

External links

Pieta Brown official web site
 
 
Pieta Brown Bio, The Rosebud Agency
Huffington Post article

1973 births
Living people
Writers from Iowa City, Iowa
American folk musicians
American women singer-songwriters
Musicians from Iowa City, Iowa
21st-century American women singers
21st-century American singers
Red House Records artists
Singer-songwriters from Iowa